Cardioglossa gracilis is a species of frog in the family Arthroleptidae.
It is found in Cameroon, Central African Republic, Democratic Republic of the Congo, Equatorial Guinea, Gabon, Nigeria, and possibly Republic of the Congo.
Its natural habitats are subtropical or tropical moist lowland forests, subtropical or tropical moist montane forests, and rivers.
It is threatened by habitat loss.

References

Cardioglossa
Taxonomy articles created by Polbot
Amphibians described in 1900